The Centre Party Youth (CUF) is the youth organization of the Centre Party in Sweden and is a liberal, green and market liberal organization.

CUF was founded 1919, under the name Swedish Rural Youth League. In 1962 the name was changed to Youth League of the Centre (Centerns Ungdomsförbund) and then in 2004 to its current name.

References

Youth wings of political parties in Sweden
Youth wings of liberal parties
Youth organizations established in 1919
1919 establishments in Sweden